Jamaluddin Rural District is in the Central District of Nazarabad County, Alborz province, Iran. Its constituent parts were in Tankaman Rural District of Nazarabad when it was a county in Tehran province, before the establishment of Alborz. At the most recent census of 2016, it had a population of 1,443 people in 477 households. The largest of its 3 villages was Karkhaneh-e Fakhr-e Iran, with 1,162 people.

References 

Nazarabad County

Rural Districts of Alborz Province

Populated places in Alborz Province

Populated places in Nazarabad County

fa:دهستان جمال الدين